Rudolph John Scholz (June 17, 1896 – December 9, 1981) was an American rugby union player who competed in the 1920 Summer Olympics and 1924 Summer Olympics.

Scholz was born in Kewanee, Illinois to Rudolph John Scholz and Catherine Scholz (née Bayer). He attended Santa Clara University, graduating in 1918 and receiving an LL.D. in 1920. He was a member of the American rugby union team, which won the gold medal at both those Olympics.

References

External links

1896 births
1981 deaths
American rugby union players
Rugby union players at the 1920 Summer Olympics
Rugby union players at the 1924 Summer Olympics
Olympic gold medalists for the United States in rugby
United States international rugby union players
Medalists at the 1924 Summer Olympics
Medalists at the 1920 Summer Olympics
Santa Clara University alumni
Rugby union scrum-halves